Moda, MoDA or MODA may refer to:

Animals 
 Moda, a common name of Potorous platyops, the broad-faced potoroo

Geography
 Moda, Kadıköy, a quarter in Kadıköy district of Istanbul, Turkey

People
 Moda Fincher, a broadcaster and member of the Texas Radio Hall of Fame
 Mo’da language
 Moda is a family name of the family originated from Bhiwani, Haryana, India. They are basically tradesmen, merchants, and belong to single gotra of Agarwal Community of India. Nowadays many people from the family occupy high position in Corporates and Government. Most of the families have divided and migrated to all over India, some also to foreign countries. Some notable people of the family are:
Rajesh Moda of Raigarh, Mahender Moda of Raigarh, Dr. S K Moda of Rohtak, Subhash Moda and Sunil Moda of Jaigaon, Moda family of Cuttuck, etc etc

Entertainment
 Moda Records, a record label
Modà, Italian rock group

Business
 Andrea Moda, an Italian fashion company
 Andrea Moda Formula, a defunct racing team, named after Andrea Moda
 Moda FC, a defunct association football club in Turkey
 Moda Center, an indoor sports arena in Portland, Oregon, USA
 Slang for the drug Modafinil
 Moda Health, a health insurance company 
 Moda Tower, an office building in Portland, Oregon, USA

Acronyms
 Museum of Design Atlanta
 Museum of Domestic Design and Architecture, London

See also
 La Moda (disambiguation)
 Mo Da